Zsolt Németh is the name of:

 Zsolt Németh (footballer) (born 1991), Hungarian-ethnic Slovak footballer
 Zsolt Németh (fencer) (born 1963), Hungarian fencer
 Zsolt Németh (hammer thrower) (born 1971), Hungarian hammer thrower
 Zsolt Németh (politician, 1963), Hungarian politician (Fidesz)
 Zsolt Németh (politician, 1984), Hungarian politician (Jobbik)
 Zsolt Németh (water polo), Hungarian water polo player
 Zsolt V. Németh, Hungarian politician (Fidesz)